A large number of Indian Standard (IS) codes are available that are meant for virtually every aspect of civil engineering one can think of. During one’s professional life one normally uses only a handful of them depending on the nature of work they are involved in. Civil engineers engaged in construction activities of large projects usually have to refer to a good number of IS codes as such projects entail use a variety of construction materials in many varieties of structures such as buildings, roads, steel structures, all sorts of foundations and what not.

A list of these codes can come in handy not only for them but also for construction-newbies, students, etc. The list provided below may not be a comprehensive one, yet it definitely includes some IS codes quite frequently used (while a few of them occasionally) by construction engineers. The description of the codes in the list may not be exactly the same as that written on the covers of the codes. Readers may add more such codes to this list and also point out slips if found in the given list.

Indian standard codes are list of codes used for civil engineers in India for the purpose of design and analysis of civil engineering structures such as buildings, dams, roads, railways, and airports.

 IS: 456 – code of practice for plain and reinforced concrete.
 IS: 383 – specifications for fine and coarse aggregate from natural sources for concrete. 
 IS: 2386 – methods of tests for aggregate for concrete. (nine parts)
 IS: 2430 – methods of sampling.
 IS: 4082 – specifications for storage of materials.
 IS: 2116 – permissible clay, silt and fine dust contents in sand.
 IS: 2250 – compressive strength test for cement mortar cubes.
 IS: 269-2015 – specifications for 33, 43 and 53 grade OPC.
 IS: 455 – specifications for PSC (Portland slag cement).
 IS: 1489 – specifications for PPC (Portland pozzolana cement).
 IS: 6909 – specifications for SSC (super-sulphated cement).
 IS: 8041 – specifications for RHPC (Rapid Hardening Portland cement)
 IS: 12330 – specifications for SRPC (sulphate resistant portland cement).
 IS: 6452 – specifications for HAC for structural use (high alumina cement).
 S: 3466 – specifications for masonry cement.
 IS: 4031 – chemical analysis and tests on cement.
 IS: 456; 10262; SP 23 – codes for designing concrete mixes.
 IS: 1199 – methods of sampling and analysis of concrete.
 IS: 516BXB JWJJS– methods of test for strength of concrete.
 IS: 13311 – ultrasonic testing of concrete structures.
 IS: 4925 – specifications for concrete batching plant.
 IS: 3025 – tests on water samples
 IS: 4990 – specifications for plywood formwork for concrete.
 IS: 9103 – specifications for concrete admixtures.  
 IS: 12200 – specifications for PVC (Polyvinyl Chloride) water bars.  
 IS: 1077 – specifications for bricks for masonry work.  
 IS: 5454 – methods of sampling of bricks for tests.  
 IS: 3495 – methods of testing of bricks.  
 IS: 1786 – cold-worked HYSD steel rebars (grades Fe415 and Fe500).  
 IS: 432; 226; 2062 – mild steel of grade I.  
 IS: 432; 1877 – mild steel of grade II.  
 IS: 1566 – specifications for hard drawn steel wire fabric for reinforcing concrete.  
 IS: 1785 – specifications for plain hard drawn steel wire fabric for prestressed concrete.  
 IS: 2090 – specifications for high tensile strength steel bar for prestressed concrete.  
 IS: 2062 – specifications for steel for general purposes.  
 IS: 226 – specifications for rolled steel made from structural steel.  
 IS: 2074 – specifications for prime coat for structural steel.  
 IS: 2932 – specifications for synthetic enamel paint for structural steel.  
 IS: 12118 – specifications for Polysulphide sealants

LIST OF INDIAN STANDARDS  
 (A) Cement
1. Specification for 33,43,53 Grade ordinary portland cement IS 269 - 2015

2. Specification for Rapid hardening portland cement IS 8041 - 1990

3. Specification for portland Pozzolona cement IS 1489 (part 1&2) 1991

4. Methods of physical test for hydraulic cement IS 4031 - 1988

5. Method of chemical analysis of hydraulic cement IS 4032 - 1985

6. Method of sampling for hydraulic cement IS 3535 - 1986

7. Standard sand testing of cement IS 650 - 1991

8. Specification for 43 Grade OPC… IS 8112 - 2013

9. Specification for 53 Grade OPC… IS 12269-1987

 (B) Coarse / Fine Aggregate
1 Specification for coarse and fine aggregate IS 383-2016

2 Methods of test for aggregate for concrete particle size and shape IS 2386 (Part I) 1963

3 Methods of test for aggregate for concrete estimation of deleterious materials and organic impurities. IS 2386 (Part II) 1963

4 Methods of test for aggregate for specific gravity, density, voids, absorption and bulking IS 2386 (Part III) 1963

5 Methods of test for aggregate for Mechanical properties. IS 2386 (Part IV) 1963

6 Methods of test for aggregate Soundness IS 2386 (Part V) 1963

7 Methods of test for aggregate measuring mortar making properties of fine aggregates.IS 2386 (Part VI) 1963

8 Methods of test for aggregate for alkali-aggregate reactivity IS 2386 (Part VII) 1963

9 Methods of test for aggregate for petrographic examination IS 2386 (Part VIII) 1963

( C ) Bricks
1 Method of sampling of clay building bricks IS 5454 - 1978

2 Method of test for burnt-clay building bricks. IS 3495 (Parts I TO iv) 1976

3 Common burnt clay building bricks. IS 1077 - 1992

(D) Masonry Mortar
1 Specification for sand for masonry mortars. IS 2116 - 1980

2 Code of practice for preparation and use of masonry mortar IS 2250 - 1981

(E) Cement Concrete
1 Specification for coarse and fine aggregate. IS 383 - 1970

2 Specification for compressive strength, flexural strength IS 516 - 1959

3 Code of Practices for plain and reinforced concrete etc. IS 456 – 2000

4 Methods of sampling and analysis of concrete IS 1199 – 1959

5 Recommended Guide Lines for Concrete Mix Design IS 10262 – 1982

(F) Curing Compound
1 Standard test method for water retention & daylight reflection test on concrete. ASTM-C-156809

2 The standard method of test for the effect of organic materials in fine aggregate on strength of mortar. ASTM-C. 87-69

3 Standard specification for liquid membranes forming compounds. ASTM C. 309-89

(G) PVC Water Stops
1 Code of practice for the provision of water stops. IS 12200 – 1987

2 Procedure for Testing Parts of IS 8543-19

3 Standard Test Methods for Tensile Properties of Plastics. ASTM : D 638-1991

4 Standard Test Methods for Thermoplastic Elastomers-Tension. ASTM : D 412-1992

(H) HYSD BARS
1 Specifications for HYSD bars. IS 1786 – 1985

2 Specification for Mild Steel and Medium Tensile steel bars. IS 432 (P II) 1966

3 Method for Tensile testing of steel wires. IS 5121 – 1972

4 Hard drawn steel wire for concrete reinforcement. IS 1566 – 1982

5 Method for Tensile testing of Steel products IS 1608 – 1972

6 Code of practice for bending & fixing of bars for concrete reinforcement IS 2502 - 1963

(I) Pre cast R.C.C. Pipes
1 Specifications for pre cast concrete pipes. IS 458 – 1988

2 Methods of Tests for concrete pipes. IS 3597 – 1985

(G) soil 
1 Preparation of dry sample (soil) IS:2720 (Part .I) 1983

2 Determination of water content (moisture content) IS:2720 (Part .II) 1973

3 Determination of specific gravity of fine-grained soil IS: 2720 (Part. III) 1980 Sect/1

4 Determination of specific gravity of fine, medium & coarse-grained soil. IS: 2720 (Part. III) 1980 Sect/2

5 Grain size analysis IS:2720 (Part.4) 1985

6 Determination of Liquid and plastic limit IS:2720 (Part.5) 1985

7 Determination of shrinkage factors IS: 2720 (Part. VI) 1987 
 
8 Determination of water content - dry density relation using light compaction. IS: 2720 (Part. VII) 1980

9 Determination of water content - dry density relation using heavy compaction.IS:2720 (Part.8) 1983

10 Determination of water content - dry density relation using constant wt. soil method. IS:2720 (Part IX) 1971

11 Determination of Unconfined compressive strength IS: 2720 (Part. X) 1991

12 Determination of shear strength parameters(tri-axial) with out measurement of pore pressure parameters(Tri-axial compaction) IS:2720(Part. XI) 1971

13 Determination of shear strength parameters (Tri-axial compaction)IS: 2720 (Part. XII) 1981

14 Direct shear test IS: 2720 (Part. XIII) 1986

15 Determination of Density Index (R.D) of cohesionless soil.IS:2720 (Part.14) 1983

16 Determination of consolidation properties IS:2720 (Part.15) 1986

17 Determination of permeability IS:2720 (Part.17) 1986

18 Determination of dry density of soils, in place by the sand replacement method. IS:2720 (Part.28) 1974

19 Determination of dry density of soils, in place by the core-cutter method.IS:2720 (Part.29) 1975

20 Laboratory vane shear test. IS:2720 (Part.30) 1980

21 Determination of the density in place by the ring and water replacement method.IS:2720 (Part.33) 1971

22 Determination of free swell index of soils IS: 2720 (Part. XI) 1977

23 Measurement of swelling pressure of soils. IS: 2720 (Part. XII) 1978

24 Classification and identification of soils for General Engineering purposes.IS:1498 1970

25 IS 13270:2013 covers fibers intended for use in fiber-reinforced concrete, in all types of concrete and mortar, including sprayed concrete, flooring, precast, in 
   situ and repair concretes.

http://apwsipnsp.gov.in/APWSIP/Downloads/PIP%20Final/QC&QA_Manual_%20WB%2028.12.2009%20as%20corrected%20by%20R.K.Malhotra%20final/List%20of%20Indian%20Standards.pdf

Soil Properties and its Testing 
 IS 2720 (All Parts)
IS 2720(Cant say's) all Properties and Testing

References

Indian standards
Indian Standard Codes